Jean-Benoît Blanc is a French-British actor and director of film and television who has worked on animations and video games in Los Angeles.

Early life
Blanc was born in Paris, the son of an English mother and a French father. He moved to England with his mother at the age of five, where he was educated at Bramcote School in Scarborough, North Yorkshire and Sedbergh School in Sedbergh, Cumbria. At the age of 16, he successfully auditioned for the National Youth Theatre. In 1987, he was accepted at the Royal Academy of Dramatic Art (RADA), the youngest person to do so that year. He graduated in 1990 and, after a short sabbatical travelling, began his theatre career.

Career
At one time, Blanc helped run the Arts Threshold theatre company and was working with companies on the London scene, collaborating with directors, including Rufus Norris, Howard Davies and Peter Hall at the Royal National Theatre. In 2001, after 12 years almost exclusively working in theatre, he played Luigi Vampa in The Count of Monte Cristo for Touchstone. Since moving to the United States, he has appeared in television series such as Barry, Masters Of Sex, Shameless, Nikita, Breaking Bad, Better Call Saul, Cold Case, CSI: New York, Raising the Bar, The Unit, Crash, NYPD Blue, Prison Break, Dr. Vegas, League of legends:Arcane and The Company.

Blanc has appeared in films, including The Incredible Hulk, Tristan & Isolde, Pirates of the Caribbean: At World's End and Moonlight Serenade. He has done voice-work for video games such as Minecraft: Story Mode, Dante's Inferno, Darksiders, Wildstar and James Bond 007: From Russia with Love, in which he played Turkish agent Kerim Bey. In 2013, he voiced Zinyak and Phillipe Loren in Saints Row IV. In 2014, he voiced Commander Kuben Blisk in Titanfall. He is currently voicing Caustic in Apex Legends.

Blanc is a leading voice director in video games and directs both live action performance capture and voice over on many of the top AAA titles.

Personal life
He lives in Los Angeles, California with his daughter, Malia.

Filmography

Voice over roles

Anime

 Bleach – Makizō Aramaki, Sajin Komamura (Ep. 99+), Nakeem Greendina, Demora, Patros, Genga, Ginrei Kuchiki, Additional Voices
 Blue Dragon – Lt. Dragnov
 Code Geass: Lelouch of the Rebellion R2 – General Upson (Ep. 6), Kolchak (Ep. 7)
 Daphne in the Brilliant Blue – Lee, Leonskii
 Dota: Dragon's Blood – Terrorblade
 Digimon Fusion – KingWhamon, AncientVolcanomon, Pharaohmon
 Freedom Project – Chairman (Ep. 7), Additional Voices
 Ghost in the Shell: S.A.C 2nd GIG – Rod (Ep. 40)
 Grand Blue – Shinji Tokita (Ep. 1+)
 Gun Sword – Domingo
 Hellsing – Enrico Maxwell, Cheddar Priest, Science Expert (Ep. 8)
 Kekkaishi – Ichirou Ogi, Ohdo (Eps. 43–44)
 Kurokami: The Animation – General Gustav (Eps. 13, 16), Howard (Ep. 14)
 L/R: Licensed by Royalty – Rowe Rickenbacker, Waiter
 Marvel Anime: Blade – Deacon Frost
 Marvel Anime: Iron Man – Prof. Michelinie
 Marvel Anime: Wolverine – Omega Red, Master Koh
 Marvel Future Avengers – Ares, Ursa Major
 Mobile Suit Gundam Unicorn – Alberto Vist, Additional Voices
 Monster – Roberto
 Naruto – Pakkun, Jiga, Hashirama Senju, others
 Naruto: Shippuden – Hiruko, Pakkun, Gataro Hashirama Senju (Ep. 226)
 Persona 4: The Animation – Ryotaro Dojima (credited as John White)
 R.O.D. the TV – Joe "Joker" Carpenter, Editor B (Ep. 10)
 Strawberry Eggs – Fortune Teller
 Texhnolyze – Mizuno

Animation

 All Hail King Julien – Benson, Mountain Lemur Captain, Jarsh-Jarsh, Caesar
 Arcane – Vander, Bolbok
 Avengers Assemble – Mangog (Ep. "All-Father's Day")
 Be Cool, Scooby-Doo! – Colander, Merry Jim, Vic (Ep. "Party Like It's 1899")
 Beware the Batman – Alfred Pennyworth, Batcomputer, Key, Lunkhead, Additional Voices
 Black Panther – Batroc, Black Knight, Male Cannibal, Additional Voices
 DreamWorks Dragons – Ryker, Jarg
 Hulk and the Agents of S.M.A.S.H. – Red Ghost (Ep. "The Defiant Hulks")
 Huntik: Secrets & Seekers – Guggenheim, Metz, Eathon Lambert, Klaus
 Jeff & Some Aliens – Alien Video Host, Butler (Ep. "Jeff & Some Laughs")
 Love, Death & Robots – Supervisor, British Man (Ep. "Good Hunting")
 The Owl House – Abomination Teacher, Additional Voices 
 Penn Zero: Part-Time Hero – Captain of the Guard
 Peter Rabbit – Mr. Bouncer, Tommy Brock
 Pickle and Peanut – Bloodbeard, Pierre, Devon, Additional Voices
 Randy Cunningham: 9th Grade Ninja – Additional Voices
 Scooby-Doo and Guess Who? – Antiques Dealer
 The Avengers: Earth's Mightiest Heroes – Wrecker, Heimdall, Additional Voices
 Transformers: Rescue Bots – Ansel Ambrose (Ep. "Phantom of the Sea")
 TripTank – Various
 Turbo FAST – Aiden Hardshell, Ari Goldfish, Snail Vendor
 Ultimate Spider-Man – Titus (Ep. "The Return of the Guardians of the Galaxy")

Film
 009 Re:Cyborg – 007 / Great Britain
 A Cat in Paris – Victor Costa
 Avengers Confidential: Black Widow & Punisher – Orion
 Berserk: The Golden Age Arc III – The Advent – Silat
 Bleach: Fade to Black – Sajin Komamura
 Bleach: Memories of Nobody – Jai
 Bleach: The DiamondDust Rebellion – Sajin Komamura
 Bleach: The Hell Verse – Sajin Komamura
 Delhi Safari – The Director, Prime Minister
 Earwig and the Witch - Mr. Jenkins
 Iron Man: Rise of Technovore – Obadiah Stane
 Lego Scooby-Doo! Haunted Hollywood – Atticus Fink, Director
 My Life as a Courgette – Additional Voices
 Naruto Shippuden the Movie: The Lost Tower – Mukade / Anrokuzan
 Redline – Lynchman 
 Time of Eve – Atsuro Masaki (uncredited)

Video games

 Apex Legends –  Kuben Blisk, Caustic
 Assassin's Creed: Revelations – Tarik Barleti
 Assassin's Creed: Liberation – Roussilon
 Batman: Arkham Knight – Chief Underhill, Edward Burke, Officer Thraves, Officer Anderson, Sergeant Badowsky, Harley Thugs
 Batman: Arkham Origins – Bane
 Batman: Arkham VR – Coroner, Thug #2
 Batman: The Enemy Within – Bane, Dying Man, Additional Voices
 Bleach: Shattered Blade – Arturo Plateado
 Bleach: The 3rd Phantom – Arturo Plateado, Sajin Komamura
 Call of Duty: Black Ops 4 – Mercenary Announcer
 Code Name: S.T.E.A.M. – Grant, Milton, Newscaster
 Command & Conquer: Red Alert 3 - Guardian Tank, Mirage Tank
 Coraline – Sergei Alexander Bobinsky, The Other Bobinsky
 Dante's Inferno – Alighiero
 Darksiders – Ulthane
 Darksiders II – Thane, Valus, Angel Hellguard
 Despicable Me – Dr. Nefario
 Diablo III – Diablo
 EverQuest II – Additional voices
 Evolve – Griffin
 Fallout 76: Steel Dawn - Mr. Clark
 Far Cry 4 – Additional voices
 Final Fantasy XIII/Final Fantasy XIII-2 – Additional Voices
 Fortnite – Dr. Vinderman, AI Vinderman, the Scientist (Season X), Chaos Agent (STW Dungeon:The Lab) 
 Fuse – Luther Deveraux
 Game of Thrones – Malcolm Branfield, Thermund, Gared's Father
 Hearthstone – Various Minions
 Horizon Zero Dawn – Rost
 Infamous 2 – Various
 Infinite Crisis – Various
 Ingress – Roland Jarvis
 James Bond 007: Agent Under Fire – Nigel Bloch
 James Bond 007: From Russia with Love – Kerim Bey
 Judgment – Ozaki, Mitsugu Matsugane (English version)
 Kingdoms of Amalur: Reckoning - Nyralim
 Klonoa – Ghadius, Soleil
 Knack – Dr. Vargus
 League of Legends – Braum, The Heart of the Freljord
 Legends of Runeterra – Braum, Laurent Bladekeeper, Jack the Winner
 Lego Batman 3: Beyond Gotham – Swamp Thing, Arkillo, The Penguin, Bane
 Lego DC Super-Villains – Bane, The Penguin, Ra's al Ghul, Solovar
 Lego Dimensions – Franz Krieger
 Lego Jurassic World – Additional Voices 
 Lego Marvel Super Heroes – Captain Britain, Kraven the Hunter, Heimdall
 Lego Marvel's Avengers – Trevor Slattery, The Other
 Lightning Returns: Final Fantasy XIII – Additional Voices
 Mad Max – additional voices
 Master of Orion: Conquer the Stars – Bulrathi Advisor, Meklar Advisor, Additional Voices
 Metal Gear Rising: Revengeance – Boris Vyacheslavovich Popov
 Metro Exodus – Yermak, Additional Voices
 Metro: Last Light – English Voice Talent
 Middle-earth: Shadow of Mordor – Tower of Sauron, Thuggish Orc
 Minecraft: Story Mode - Season Two – The Admin / Romeo, Vos, Additional Voices
 Mortal Kombat 11 – Kano
 Mother of Myth – Acis
 Naruto: Clash of Ninja Revolution 3 – Sasori (Hiruko)
 Naruto: Ninja Council 4 – Sasori (Hiruko)
 Naruto: Ultimate Ninja 2 – Traveling Merchant
 Naruto: Ultimate Ninja 3 – First Hokage / Hashirama Senju
 Naruto: Ultimate Ninja 4 – Sasori (Hiruko)
 Naruto: Ultimate Ninja 5 – Sasori (Hiruko)
 Persona 4 – Ryotaro Dojima (uncredited)
 Rainbow Six Siege – Oryx
 Resident Evil: The Darkside Chronicles – Brian Irons
 Ruined King: A League of Legends Story – Braum, The Heart of the Freljord
 Saints Row IV – Zinyak, Phillipe Loren
 Sengoku Basara: Samurai Heroes - Additional voices (warriors)
 Skylanders: Imaginators – Spy Rise, Hood Sickle, Ambush
 Skylanders: SuperChargers – Spy Rise, Hood Sickle
 Skylanders: Swap Force – Spy Rise
 Skylanders: Trap Team – Spy Rise, Hood Sickle
 SOCOM: US Navy SEALs Fireteam Bravo 2 – Condor
 Spyro Reignited Trilogy – Moneybags
 Star Wars Jedi: Fallen Order – Prauf
 Star Wars: Knights of the Old Republic – Additional Voices
 Street Fighter IV/Super Street Fighter IV – El Fuerte
 Tales of Vesperia - Barbos
 Team Fortress 2 – Saxton Hale
 The Amazing Spider-Man 2 – Wilson Fisk / Kingpin
 The Crew – Omar
 The Elder Scrolls Online – Sheogorath, King Kurog, Divyath Fyr, Male Altmer, Male Breton, Male Dunmer, Male Khajiit
 The Wonderful 101 – Wonder-Yellow
 Titanfall – Commander Kuben Blisk
 Titanfall 2 – Commander Kuben Blisk
 Uncharted 3: Drake's Deception – Thugs
 Uncharted 4: A Thief's End – Knot
 Uncharted: Golden Abyss – General Roberto Guerro
 WildStar – Caretaker, Ionis the Watcher, Luminai Male
 World of Warcraft – Ignis, Imperator Mar'gok
 World of Warcraft: Battle for Azeroth – Captain Jolly
 World of Warcraft: Cataclysm – Asaad, High Priest Venoxis
 World of Warcraft: Mists of Pandaria – Riko, Commander Durand, Manchu
 World of Warcraft: Warlords of Draenor – Additional Voices
 World of Warcraft: Wrath of the Lich King – Mage-Lord Urom, Ignis the Furnace Master
 Yakuza: Like a Dragon – Ryuhei Hoshino

Live action roles

Film

Television

Staff work
 Fortnite – Voice Director
 Call of Duty: Vanguard – Voice and Performance Capture Director
 Diablo Immortal – Voice Director
 Diablo 4 – Voice Director
 Hearthstone – Voice Director
 League of Legends – Voice Director
 Legends of Runeterra – Voice Director
 World of Warcraft – Voice Director
 Heroes of the Storm – Voice Director
 Overwatch – Voice Director
 Mafia 3 – Voice Director
 Middle Earth: Shadow of War – Voice Director
 Lego Batman 3: Beyond Gotham – Voice Director
 Lego Dimensions – Voice Director
 L/R: Licensed by Royalty – ADR Director
 Mafia III – Voice Director
 Middle-earth: Shadow of Mordor – Voice Director
 Rubber Soul – Dialogue Coach
 Sugartown – Acting Coach, Executive Producer
 The Informers – Dialect Coach
 Uncharted 4: A Thief's End – Dialect Coach (Nadine Ross)
 XCOM 2 – Voice Director

References

External links
 
 
 

Living people
Actors from Scarborough, North Yorkshire
Alumni of RADA
French male film actors
French male television actors
French male video game actors
French male voice actors
French emigrants to the United States
French emigrants to England
French people of English descent
National Youth Theatre members
People educated at Sedbergh School
French voice directors
Year of birth missing (living people)